Enrique Collar Monterrubio (born 2 November 1934) is a Spanish former professional footballer who played as a left winger. He earned 16 caps and scored 4 goals for the Spain national football team from 1955 to 1963. He played in the 1962 FIFA World Cup.

International goals

Honours
Murcia
Segunda Division: 1954-55

Atlético Madrid
UEFA Cup Winners' Cup: 1961–62
Spanish League: 1965–66
Spanish Cup: 1959–60, 1960–61, 1964–65

Spain U18
UEFA U-18 Championship: 1952

External links

 
 National team data 
 
 Cádiz CF profile 
 Valencia CF profile 
 

1934 births
Living people
People from Seville (comarca)
Sportspeople from the Province of Seville
Spanish footballers
Footballers from Andalusia
Association football forwards
La Liga players
Atlético Madrid footballers
Cádiz CF players
Real Murcia players
Valencia CF players
Spain youth international footballers
Spain B international footballers
Spain international footballers
1962 FIFA World Cup players